Hal Borne (December 26, 1911, Chicago, Illinois - February 25, 2000, Tarzana, California) was an American popular song composer, orchestra leader, music arranger and musical director, who studied music at the University of Illinois. He often collaborated with lyricists Sid Kuller and Ray Golden, including songs for the Marx Brothers ("Sing While You Sell") and Tony Martin ("Tenement Symphony").

At the beginning of his career Hal Borne worked for RKO Radio Pictures as the rehearsal pianist for Fred Astaire. He became a key musical contributor to the Fred Astaire-Ginger Rogers musicals, arranging new Jerome Kern and Irving Berlin songs; Hal Borne came up with the familiar three-note obbligato to Berlin's "Cheek to Cheek" ("Heaven... [obbligato] I'm in heaven [obbligato]") in the 1935 film Top Hat. 

In 1941 he collaborated with Duke Ellington, Paul Francis Webster and Kuller on the progressive all-black revue Jump for Joy, which was supported by many Hollywood liberals of the time, such as Groucho Marx, Mickey Rooney, and Orson Welles. Borne became a big-band orchestra leader and in February 1942 signed as the music director for RCM's Soundies (musical shorts filmed for jukeboxes) for which his trio often provided backings.<ref>Billboard, February 28, 1942.</ref> 

Borne joined ASCAP in 1942 and was one of the composers for Ray Golden's 1950 revue Alive and Kicking, featuring Jack Cassidy, Bobby Van and Carl Reiner and the debut of Gwen Verdon. For many years Borne was associated with Tony Martin and became his regular music director for live and TV appearances throughout the 1950s and 60s. He scored the nudie film Not Tonight Henry in 1960, and in 1963 he composed most of the songs for the infamous first topless mainstream movie Promises! Promises!, starring Jayne Mansfield and Marie (the Body) McDonald—not to be confused with the subsequent Neil Simon-Burt Bacharach musical Promises, Promises. His other film work included the scores to The Explosive Generation (1961), Flight of the Lost Balloon (1961) and Hillbillys in a Haunted House (1967).

He was celebrated for his piano improvisations and often jammed in duets with Ellington on the spinet. Among his many albums, he supported Marie McDonald for her 1957 musical foray "The Body Sings"''.

References

1911 births
2000 deaths
Musicians from Chicago
American male composers
Music directors
American music arrangers
20th-century American composers
20th-century American male musicians